FabricLive.37 is a 2007 album by the British dubstep producers Caspa and Rusko. The album was released as part of the FabricLive Mix Series and was the first edition of the series to feature the dubstep genre of electronic music. Some of the tracks feature samples from the Guy Ritchie film Snatch, the Nick Love film The Business, the TV series The Armando Iannucci Shows and Willy Wonka & the Chocolate Factory. The album featured other notable primarily dubstep producers such as Skream, Coki, Buraka Som Sistema and many more.

Reception
Red Bull Music UK described FabricLive.37 as "changing the course of [dubstep]", while Will Pritchard of Pitchfork wrote that it "helped transform dubstep from a bubbling scene to a global phenomenon".

Track listing

References

External links
Fabric: FabricLive.37
Djscene.lt: FabricLive.37 review

Fabric (club) albums
Caspa albums
Rusko (musician) albums
2007 compilation albums